Hanyang University Gymnasium is an indoor sporting arena located in Seoul, South Korea.  The capacity of the arena is 8,000 people and was built in 1986 to host volleyball events at the 1988 Summer Olympics. It hosted a sport stacking task on The Amazing Race 29 and The Amazing Race Australia 4.  An indoor gymnasium with two stories underground and four stories above ground with reinforced concrete truss structure built on the campus of Hanyang University in Haengdang-dong, Seongdong-gu. It is a building of 31,247  m2 with a building area of 31,247  m2 and its size is 80m * 80m * 26m. The floor of the stadium is 50m * 36m (Maple tree floor) and the practice field: 37m * 21m (2 sides). In the 1988 Seoul Olympics, it is offered as a volleyball arena. Evening games are possible.

See also
 List of indoor arenas in South Korea

References

1988 Summer Olympics official report. Volume 1. Part 1. p. 194.

Indoor arenas in South Korea
Venues of the 1988 Summer Olympics
Olympic volleyball venues
Sports venues in Seoul
Sports venues completed in 1986
Volleyball venues in South Korea
Gymnasium
1986 establishments in South Korea
Venues of the 1986 Asian Games